Triepeolus loomisorum is a species of cuckoo bee in the family Apidae. It is found in Central America and North America.

References

Further reading

 
 

Nomadinae
Articles created by Qbugbot
Insects described in 1989